Leslie Gaius John Sheppard (6 August 1915 – 26 February 2015) was the first British soldier in World War II to destroy a German tank. He has been awarded the Distinguished Conduct Medal.

Sheppard used to serve in the Leicestershire Regiment.

References

External links
Bbc.co.uk
Armycadets.com

1915 births
2015 deaths
Royal Leicestershire Regiment soldiers
British Army personnel of World War II
Recipients of the Distinguished Conduct Medal
People from Hertfordshire
Military personnel from Hertfordshire